Arthur Edward Joseph Tonkin  (19 October 1922 – c. 1991) was an Australia national representative rugby union footballer who featured in the 1947–48 Wallaby tour of the British Isles.

Early life
Tonkin's father was one of the pioneers of the New South Wales Country Rugby League but made no attempt to influence his three children on which sports they should play. Arthur went to Wagga Wagga Christian Brothers' and later to St. Joseph's College, Hunters Hill where he benefited under Brother Henry, the College's legendary coach of the 1930s. He won the GPS Schools sprint championship in 1942 and was an army sprint champion during his wartime service. He was a gunner in the AIF who saw three years of active service during World War II.

Club rugby
Tonkin joined the Gordon Club after his discharge and played the first of six matches for New South Wales in 1947. A powerfully built sprinter he added menace to every team in which he played because of his rare acceleration and scoring potential.

Representative rugby career
He missed a place in the Test against New Zealand in 1947 but was selected for that year's
epic Wallaby tour and became one of the spearheads of Australia's attack in Britain after champion Manly winger Charlie Eastes broke his leg in an early tour match. Tonkin appeared on the wing in all five Tests of the tour using his blinding acceleration to get around his opposing wingers to score tries against Scotland and Ireland. He was also one of four kickers who figured in the Tests (along with Brain Piper, Trevor Allan and Bob McMaster) kicking two penalties against France in the Paris Test at Stade Colombes. Injury affected his representative prospects after the conclusion of the tour but he made a further Test appearance against the British Lions in Sydney in 1950.

Post playing
Tonkin became a lecturer in physical education after his football career ended and worked at Armidale Teachers' College where he also coached rugby. He retired in 1982, leaving the coaching of college rugby teams to John Hipwell.

Footnotes

References
 The Spirit of Rugby (1995) A collection of essays, HarperCollins, Australia (Phil Tressider's The Class of '47–48 1st published Sydney's Daily Telegraph 1987)
 Howell, Max (2005) Born to Lead – Wallaby Test Captains, Celebrity Books, Auckland NZ
Tonkin in City of Wagga Sporting Hall of Fame

1922 births
1991 deaths
Australian rugby union players
Australia international rugby union players
Australian military personnel of World War II
Australian schoolteachers
Australian soldiers
People educated at St Joseph's College, Hunters Hill
Rugby union players from Wagga Wagga
Rugby union wings